General Dayton may refer to:

Elias Dayton (1737–1807), New Jersey Militia brigadier general in the American Revolutionary War
Keith Dayton (born 1949), U.S. Army lieutenant general
Oscar Veniah Dayton (1827–1898), Union Army brevet brigadier general of volunteers